Eridania Lake is a theorized ancient lake on Mars with a surface area of roughly 1.1 million square kilometers. It is located at the source of the Ma'adim Vallis outflow channel and extends into Eridania quadrangle and the Phaethontis quadrangle. As Eridania Lake dried out in the late Noachian epoch it divided into a series of smaller lakes.

Later research with CRISM found thick deposits, greater than 400 meters thick, that contained the minerals saponite, talc-saponite, Fe-rich mica (for example, glauconite-nontronite), Fe- and Mg-serpentine, Mg-Fe-Ca-carbonate and probable Fe-sulphide.  The Fe-sulphide probably formed in deep water from water heated by volcanoes.  Such a process, classified as hydrothermal may have been a place where life began.

See also

 CRISM
 Eridania quadrangle
 Lakes on Mars
 Water on Mars

References

External links
  Lakes on Mars – Nathalie Cabrol (SETI Talks)

Surface features of Mars
Former lakes